Sandra Destenave (born Sandra Irene Destenave Fernández on November 6, 1972, in Chihuahua, Mexico) is a Mexican actress, model and hostess.

Early life
Destenave was born on November 6, 1972, in Chihuahua, Mexico. In 1995 she became Miss Coahuila and placed second in the national competition. In Mexico City she served for several years as a model for Contempo agency, featuring in several advertising campaigns.

In 1995 she graduated in psychology from the Universidad Autónoma de La Laguna. She studied film, Theatre and Drama in the Lumière Institute and later entered the Televisa Center for Arts Education (CEA).

Filmography

References

External links

1972 births
Living people
Mexican telenovela actresses
Mexican television actresses
Mexican film actresses
Mexican female models
Mexican television presenters
Mexican television talk show hosts
Actresses from Chihuahua (state)
21st-century Mexican actresses
People from Chihuahua City
Mexican women television presenters
Universidad Autónoma de La Laguna alumni